Indianapolis 500 Legends is a racing game recounting the history of the Indianapolis 500. Players take on the roles of various famous racers between 1961 and 1971, completing tasks such as overtaking a specified number of cars or qualifying under a set time. Some missions will change the course of history, such as guiding Parnelli Jones to victory in 1967 when historically, in the 197th lap, a faulty bearing ground his car to a halt. The option will also be given to race the full 200 laps. Players are also able to unlock three different '500' racers as they complete their missions under Mission Mode. Some of the missions are: 'epic', 'pit stop', 'race', 'battle', 'qualify', 'dodge' and 'pass'.

Reception 

The DS version received "mixed" reviews, while the Wii version received "generally unfavorable reviews", according to the review aggregation website Metacritic.

References

External links 
 

2007 video games
Wii games
North America-exclusive video games
Video games developed in Australia
Nintendo DS games
Racing video games
Video games set in Indianapolis
IndyCar Series video games
Racing video games set in the United States
Torus Games games
Multiplayer and single-player video games